The Fowlkes–Mallows index  is an external evaluation method that is used to determine the similarity between two clusterings (clusters obtained after a clustering algorithm), and also a metric to measure confusion matrices. This measure of similarity could be either between two hierarchical clusterings or a clustering and a benchmark classification. A higher value for the Fowlkes–Mallows index indicates a greater similarity between the clusters and the benchmark classifications. It was invented by Bell Labs statisticians Edward Fowlkes and Collin Mallows in 1983.

Preliminaries
The Fowlkes–Mallows index, when results of two clustering algorithms are used to evaluate the results, is defined as

The minimum possible value of the Fowlkes–Mallows index is 0, which corresponds to the worst binary classification possible, where all the elements have been misclassified. And the maximum possible value of the Fowlkes–Mallows index is 1, which corresponds to the best binary classification possible, where all the elements have been perfectly classified.

Definition
The trees  and  can be cut to produce  clusters for each tree (by either selecting clusters at a particular height of the tree or setting different strength of the hierarchical clustering).

 
where

For each  we have .

Fowlkes–Mallows index can also be defined based on the number of points that are common or uncommon in the two hierarchical clusterings. If we define

It can be shown that the four counts have the following property

and that the Fowlkes–Mallows index for two clusterings can be defined as

The Fowlkes–Mallows index is the geometric mean of precision and recall.

Discussion
Since the index is directly proportional to the number of true positives, a higher index means greater similarity between the two clusterings used to determine the index. One basic way to test the validity of this index is to compare two clusterings that are unrelated to each other. Fowlkes and Mallows showed that on using two unrelated clusterings, the value of this index approaches zero as the number of total data points chosen for clustering increase; whereas the value for the Rand index for the same data quickly approaches  making Fowlkes–Mallows index a much more accurate representation for unrelated data. This index also performs well if noise is added to an existing dataset and their similarity compared. Fowlkes and Mallows showed that the value of the index decreases as the component of the noise increases. The index also showed similarity even when the noisy dataset had a different number of clusters than the clusters of the original dataset. Thus making it a reliable tool for measuring similarity between two clusters.

See also 
 F1 score
 Matthews correlation coefficient
 Confusion matrix

References

External links 
 Implementation of Fowlkes–Mallows index in R.

Clustering criteria
Bell Labs